Womanhood, the Glory of the Nation is a 1917 American lost silent drama film directed by J. Stuart Blackton and William P. S. Earle, and written by Blackton, Helmer W. Bergman, and Cyrus Townsend Brady. It is a sequel to the 1915 movie The Battle Cry of Peace. The film stars Alice Joyce and Harry T. Morey. It is a lost film.

Plot
Traveling in Europe, Mary Ward fascinates Count Darius of Ruritania who asks her in marriage. Promising him an answer, Mary returns to the United States via Manila. Passing through the Philippines, he learns that New York was unexpectedly attacked by Ruritania and, in the course of the attack, his mother and sister were killed. Paul Strong, an American politician, takes Mary back to her homeland and in New York opens a campaign to reorganize the army. Paul's sister Jane, who shows up at the rallies impersonating Joan of Arc to inflame the souls of the patriots, is killed. Mary uses her fascination with Dario, whose father is in charge of the forces of Ruritania, to steal military secrets from him. Count Dario is shot by his father, The Marshal Prince Dario for disobedience of orders. Among wounded veterans - like Philip, Mary's brother, blind from the war -, espionage and battles, the United States manages to win the war led by Paul to victory and defeat the Rurite army. He and Mary, hugging each other in New York, now happily observe a once again prosperous and peaceful city.

Cast list

See also
The Battle Cry of Peace
Invasion literature

References

1917 films
1917 drama films
American silent feature films
Films directed by J. Stuart Blackton
Films directed by William P. S. Earle
1910s American films